The Mountain Lion is a 1947 novel by Jean Stafford.

Overview
Eight-year-old Molly and her ten-year-old brother Ralph are inseparable.  One summer they are sent from the Los Angeles suburb they call home to backwoods Colorado, where their uncle Claude has a ranch.

References

1947 American novels
Novels set in Colorado
Harcourt (publisher) books